The 2007 Porsche Carrera Cup Great Britain was the fifth season of the one-make championship. It consisted of 20 rounds, beginning on 31 March at Brands Hatch and finishing on 14 October at Thruxton. The series supported the British Touring Car Championship throughout the season. James Sutton won the championship at his first attempt, ahead of Tim Harvey and Steven Kane after a close points battle.

Entry List
 All drivers raced in Porsche 911 GT3s.

Calendar & Winners
All races were held in the United Kingdom.

Championship Standings
Points were awarded on a 20, 18, 16, 14, 12, 10, 9, 8, 7, 6, 5, 4, 3, 2, 1 basis to the top 15 finishers in each race, with 1 point for the fastest lap in each race and 1 point for pole position in the first race of each meeting.

External links
 Porsche Carrera Cup Great Britain

Porsche Carrera Cup GB
Porsche Carrera Cup Great Britain seasons